Pierrotage is a half-timbered timber framing technique in which stone infill is used between posts. It was used in France and by French settlers in  French Canada and Upper Louisiana.

See also
Bousillage
French architecture
French colonization of the Americas
New France
Poteaux-en-terre
Poteaux-sur-solle
Ste. Genevieve, Missouri
Vernacular architecture

References

Timber framing
New France
French colonial architecture
French-Canadian culture in the United States
French-American culture in Missouri
Missouri culture
Vernacular architecture